John Tillett may refer to
 John Tillett (British Army officer) (1919–2014)
 John Tillett (impresario), British concert manager, founder of Ibbs and Tillett